The Hau Nui Wind Farm is a 15-turbine wind farm located approximately  south-east of Martinborough, in the South Wairarapa District of New Zealand. Hau Nui (Māori for "big wind") was the first wind farm built in New Zealand.

The wind farm was built in two stages and the completed capacity is 8.65 MW.

Site
Hau Nui wind farm is located on a ridge adjacent to White Rock Road, the main road between Martinborough and White Rock. Stage 1 is situated on Range Road near its intersection with White Rock Road. Stage 2 is located approximately one kilometre south of Stage 1 on Range Road.

Turbines
Hau Nui has a total of fifteen Enercon E-40 wind turbines. The seven Stage 1 turbines are third-generation turbines, delivering 550 kW each. The eight Stage 2 turbines are later versions of the same Enercon E-40 model, each generating 600 kW each.

Transmission
Electricity generated by Hau Nui is injected into the local distribution grid. The 400 V electricity generated by each turbine is stepped up by transformers at the base of the turbine - to 11,000 V for stage 1 turbines and 33,000 V for stage 2 turbines.

33 kV lines from stage 2 take electricity  to Martinborough to supply the town. Stage 1 turbines connect to 11 kV lines to supply the local area, or connect to the Stage 2 to Martinborough 33 kV lines through a 750 kVA transformer to the north side of the stage.

During peak demand, electricity generated by Hau Nui is used by Martinborough and the eastern South Wairarapa district. During off-peak, Hau Nui electricity can supply the entire South Wairarapa district via 33 kV lines connecting Martinborough with Featherston, Greytown, and Pirinoa. If local demand is low, some electricity may be exported to the national grid through Transpower's Greytown substation.

See also

Wind power in New Zealand

References

External links 
 

Wind farms in New Zealand
Buildings and structures in the Wairarapa